High speed rail in Uzbekistan currently consists of 600 km of track and services using Talgo 250 equipment, branded Afrosiyob by operator Uzbekistan Railways, on upgraded conventional lines. All HSR lines have been built using upgraded lines on Russian gauge.  Other regional railways exist.

The country currently has two interoperated lines: 
 Tashkent–Samarkand high-speed rail line, opened 2011 using HSR capable trains while upgrading taking over 2.5 hours, in 2013 the 344 km route full commercial speed taking 2 hours and 8 minutes. Uzbekistan Railways management has raised the possibility of building a dedicated electrified line from Tashkent to Samarkand, shortening the journey to 1 hour and 20 minutes. 
 Samarkand-Bukhara high-speed rail line, opened Aug 2016, extension of the first line, 256 km taking 1 hour 12 minutes, or from Tashkent 3 hours and 20 minutes.
Samarkand-Qarshi high-speed rail line, a 141 km long extension to Qarshi started operation on August 22, 2015, though at lower speed of 160 km/h. 

By 2018, the high speed rail was operating beyond capacity, and tickets had to be booked months in advance. To combat this issue, the railway awarded a $62 million contract to Talgo to purchase an additional two 250 km/h tilting trains due to enter service in 2021, to join the other four currently in service; the new contract also requests extra coaches to expand the current nine-car trains to 11 cars each.
Services from Tashkent to Almaty, Kazakhstan have been steadily improving from a travel time of 30 hours during the Soviet era to 16.5 hours as of 2017.  There is also a 1.5 hour customs stop at the border.  The service uses Tulpar-Talgo equipment of joined Uzbek-Kazakh rail cars.  Similarly, the route from Almaty to the Chinese HSR rail head at Urumqi has been upgraded to 8 hours (change of gauge), qualifying as a higher-speed rail link.  Chinese may be looking to develop the entire Urumqi and Tashkent segment into a full speed HSR line due to Belt and Road, but as of 2017 this is far from certain.  There is also a track gauge difference that effectively prevents high speed usage of current Uzbek HSR by China.

In January 2021, the Kazakh Prime Minister Asqar Mamin announced plans to extend the line in Tashkent across the border to Shymkent and Turkestan.

In April 2022, the Asian Infrastructure Investment Bank provided a $108 million loan to Uzbekistan for electrification of the 465km line between Bukhara and Khiva, and high-speed trainsets are intended to eventually travel between Tashkent and Khiva. The current unelectrified line already has a design speed of 250km/h, and running the Afrosiyob trainsets will reduce travel time from six hours to two hours.

References

 
High-speed rail in Asia